The South Mainland of the Shetland Islands is the southern peninsula of Mainland island. It lies south of Hellister (60° 14′N). The greater southern part of the peninsula belongs to the civil parish of Dunrossness. The rest belongs to the parishes of Lerwick and Tingwall (small part of the latter). St Ninian's Isle is a tidal island off its west coast.

Geography
Points of interest include:
Lerwick
Scalloway
Veensgarth
Gulberwick
Quarff
Cunningsburgh
Sandwick
Hoswick
Bigton
Scousburgh
Fitful Head
Sumburgh Head

References

Geography of Shetland
Mainland, Shetland